The Ohio River Water Trail navigates the counties of Allegheny, Beaver, Columbiana, and Hancock in the states of Ohio, Pennsylvania, and West Virginia. The trail is under the stewardship of the Ohio River Trail Council. The water trail or blueway geographically extends from the Three Rivers Water Trail in Pittsburgh, Pennsylvania, to Newell, West Virginia, and East Liverpool, Ohio. The 69-mile Ohio River Water Trail (ORWT) includes 13 miles of the Ohio River along the Three Rivers Water Trail from "The Point" in Pittsburgh at milepost zero downstream to the Dashields Lock and Dam at milepost 13, 33 miles of the Ohio River from Dashields Dam at milepost 13, downstream to Newell at milepost 46.0, 16 miles of the Little Beaver Creek to Beaver Creek State Park, three miles of the Beaver River to the Townsend (Fallston) Dam, and four miles of the Raccoon Creek.

History 
The Ohio River Water Trail was conceived and developed by Dr. Vincent Troia, Executive Director of the Ohio River Trail Council. The Ohio River Water Trail project originated in 2010 to develop a dedicated safe route for boats that provides a destination for canoeing, kayaking, fishing, small motorized watercraft, and other recreation. These routes establish recreational corridors between specific locations and can include boat launches and access points, day-use sites, and in some cases overnight camping.

The Ohio River Water Trail project's goal was to connect Pittsburgh, Pa to its neighboring communities along the Ohio River while building a sense of place and offering an enormous opportunity for recreation for the 1.6 million residents living along the Ohio River Water Trail in southwest Pennsylvania. To that end, the Ohio River Trail Council specifically focused on establishing four access points for canoes and kayaks: One on the Ohio River in Monaca, two into the Beaver River in Rochester and Bridgewater, and one into Little Beaver Creek at Lock 57 Community Park in Ohioville.

Map & Guide 
The Ohio River Water Trail Map and Guide is available on the Ohio River Trail and the Pennsylvania Fish & Boat Commission websites.

Pennsylvania Water Trail 
On January 4, 2012, the Ohio River Water Trail received the Pennsylvania designation as an official state water trail by the Pennsylvania Water Trails Partnership. The members of the partnership include the Pennsylvania Department of Conservation and Natural Resources, Pennsylvania Environmental Council, Pennsylvania Fish & Boat Commission, National Park Service – Chesapeake Bay Gateways & Watertrails Network, and the National Park Service Rivers, Trails & Conservation Assistance Program. Each water trail is unique, a reflection of Pennsylvania's diverse geology, ecology and communities.

National Recreation Trail
The Ohio River Water Trail was designated as a National Recreation Trail (NRT) on June 4, 2015. NRT is a designation given to trails that contribute to the health, conservation, and recreation goals in the United States. Over 1,148 trails in all 50 U.S. states, available for public use and ranging from less than a mile to 485 miles (781 km) in length, have been designated as NRTs on federal, state, municipal, and privately owned lands. 
 The National Park Service jointly administers the NRT program in conjunction with a number of federal and not-for-profit partners, notably American Trails, which hosts the NRT website.

See also
 Canoe
 Georgetown Island
 Kayak
 Ohio River
 Ohio River Islands National Wildlife Refuge
 Phillis Island
 Waterway

References

External links 
 Ohio River Water Trail
 Pennsylvania Fish & Boat Commission
 National Recreation Trail
 Pennsylvania Environmental Council
 Water Trail Resources (from the National Park Service Rivers, Trails, and Conservation Assistance)
 National Trails Training Partnership: Water and Boating Trails
 National Park Service Rivers, Trails, and Conservation Assistance Program 

Tourist attractions in Beaver County, Pennsylvania
Water trails
Beaver
Geography of Beaver County, Pennsylvania
National Recreation Trails in Ohio
National Recreation Trails in Pennsylvania
National Recreation Trails in West Virginia